Parliamentary elections were held in Seychelles on 6 December 2002. The result was a victory for the ruling Seychelles People's Progressive Front, which won 18 of the 25 constituency seats and five of the nine proportional representation seats.

Results

References

Elections in Seychelles
Seychelles
2002 in Seychelles
December 2002 events in Africa